"Harlem" is a song by alternative rock band New Politics, released as the first single from their second album A Bad Girl in Harlem.

The song was featured in NHL 14, Guitar Hero Live and Windows 8.1. It is also featured as a "Now! What's Next" bonus track on Now That's What I Call Music! 48. It also appears on the trailer for the 2013 Disney film Frozen.

Charts

Year-end charts

Certifications

References

New Politics (band) songs
2013 songs
2013 singles
RCA Records singles